Acacia gibsonii, commonly known as Gibson's wattle, is a shrub belonging to the genus Acacia and the subgenus Juliflorae.

Description
The terete branchlets are a reddish brown colour that age to a light grey colour. Like most species of Acacia it has phyllodes rather than true leaves. The phyllodes are glabrous with minute, red to brown coloured trichomes with three prominent longitudinal nerves.

Distribution
It is native to a small area in the Goldfields-Esperance region of Western Australia to the south of the Norseman–Hyden Road where it is reasonably common within the restricted locale. It is usually situated on gentle rocky slopes where it grows in skeletal red-loamy soils over greenstone base rocks in shrubland communities that are dominated by Allocasuarina campestris, Allocasuarina globosa and Calothamnus quadrifidus.

See also
 List of Acacia species

References

gibsonii
Acacias of Western Australia
Taxa named by Bruce Maslin
Plants described in 2013